The following highways in Virginia have been known as State Route 29:
 State Route 29 (Virginia 1923–1933), now mostly Virginia State Route 14
 U.S. Route 29 in Virginia, 1931–present
 State Route 29 (Virginia 1933-1947), Culpeper to Warrenton